Laportea peduncularis, the river nettle, is a herbaceous plant in the family Urticaceae. It is consumed for its anti-inflammatory effects.

References

peduncularis